The Damascus Opera House (officially Dar al-Assad for Culture and Arts) is the national opera house of Syria. Inaugurated on 7 May 2004, it is located in central Damascus, on the Umayyad Square.

History
Damascus already had an opera house in the 1900s. During the French colonial period, Shahbandar's People's Party held their inaugural meeting at the old Damascus Opera House in 1925. Hafez al-Assad planned the opera house early in his rule, but work did not recommence until the 2000s and Assad's son Bashar and his wife opened the new opera house in 2004.

The new Damascus Opera House
The opera house is a five-level building that includes a 1300-seat theatre for musical productions, a drama theatre of some 600 seats and a small multipurpose hall. Since its opening, it has been the venue of numerous theatrical performances and concerts of classical European or Arabic music, as well as of film shows, such as the European Film Festival in Syria, before the civil war started in 2011.

The Damascus Opera House is the main venue of the Syrian National Symphony Orchestra (SNSO) that has made frequent contributions to musical life in the Syrian capital. Compositions by contemporary Syrian composers have been performed by the SNSO, including works by Iraqi-born musician and educator Solhi al-Wadi, violinist Maias Alyamani, pianist Malek Jandali, or Zaid Jabri, featuring Syrian musicians with international careers, like clarinet soloist Kinan Azmeh.

In 2014, the Opera House was the target of mortar attacks, attributed to rebels against the Syrian government. According to a report in The Times of Israel, two students of the adjacent Higher Institute of Dramatic Arts were killed and several more seriously wounded.

Damascus Opera Company
Aside from visiting foreign artists, the company produced The Marriage of Figaro in 2010. In 2011, the general director of the house and its company was violinist Maria Arnaout, who produced the short opera Gianni Schicchi by Puccini, an international Oriental Music Festival and a Syrian version of the musical Oliver!, casting orphans after the model of Venezuela's El Sistema music organization with street children. So far, the opera house has not included in its programmes opera in Arabic or art song in Arabic.

Organ 
One of the world's four hovering air cushion organs is installed in the opera house. The organ was built in 2000 by the organ builder Aug. Laukhuff from Weikersheim in Germany. The instrument has 40 stops on four manuals. The organ can be raised with air cushions and moved on stage. By means of compressors, the air cushions are inflated to such an extent that they lift the 18-ton organ evenly and noiselessly until it floats above the ground. The organ can be moved and set up remotely at any point on the stage. Due to the ongoing civil war in Syria, the opera House lacks the money to maintain the instrument.

See also

 List of opera houses
 Music of Syria

References

2004 establishments in Syria
Buildings and structures in Damascus
Music venues completed in 2004
Opera houses in Syria
Syrian music
Theatres in Syria
Theatres completed in 2004